The Apostles is a 2014 Chinese horror thriller film directed by Joe Chien. It was released in China on 17 January.

Cast
Josie Ho
Fan Hsia
Lam Suet
Lam Chi-chung

Reception
The film has grossed US$1.13 million at the Chinese box office.

References

External links
 
 HKcinemagic entry

2014 films
2014 horror thriller films
Chinese horror thriller films
2010s Mandarin-language films